José Luis Cano Losa (born 28 April 1988) is a Spanish former professional road cyclist, who competed for  for two seasons.

References

External links

1988 births
Living people
Spanish male cyclists
Sportspeople from the Province of Ciudad Real
Cyclists from Castilla-La Mancha